The Potamkin Cadillac Classic was a golf tournament on the LPGA Tour from 1968 to 1984 sponsored by Victor Potamkin. It was played at three different courses in the Atlanta, Georgia area.

At the 1982 Lady Michelob, Joan Joyce set a tour record by only taking 17 putts during  the tournament's final round.

Tournament locations

Winners
Potamkin Cadillac Classic
1984 Sharon Barrett

Lady Michelob
1983 Janet Coles
1982 Kathy Whitworth
1981 Amy Alcott
1980 Pam Higgins
1979 Sandra Post

Natural Light Lady Tara Classic
1978 Janet Coles

Lady Tara Classic
1977 Hollis Stacy
1976 JoAnne Carner
1975 Donna Caponi
1974 Sandra Spuzich
1973 Mary Mills

Lady Pepsi Open
1972 Jan Ferraris
1971 Jane Blalock

Lady Carling Open
1970 Jane Blalock
1969 Kathy Whitworth
1968 Carol Mann

References

External links
Canongate Country Club
Indian Hills Country Club
Brookfield West Golf & Country Club

Former LPGA Tour events
Recurring sporting events established in 1968
Recurring sporting events disestablished in 1984
Golf in Georgia (U.S. state)
History of women in Georgia (U.S. state)